Australian Grand Prix can refer to:

Australian Grand Prix, a Formula One motor race
Australian motorcycle Grand Prix
Speedway Grand Prix of Australia